xoa is a studio album/compilation album by American singer-songwriter Anaïs Mitchell, released in 2014 on Wilderland Records, on 30 September in the US and October the 6th in the UK.

Background
The album was recorded with Gary Paczosa in Nashville and includes a selection of new songs and re-recorded tracks from Mitchell's back catalogue. The record saw a limited release, and was meant as a thank you to fans, Anaïs saying "if the title were longer, it would be 'dear audience, thank you for everything'". "Any Way the Wind Blows" was later featured in the musical adaptation of her fourth studio album Hadestown.

Track listing
"Any Way the Wind Blows" – 2:30
"Out of Pawn" (from The Brightness) – 4:13
"Your Fonder Heart" (from The Brightness) – 3:21
"Why We Build the Wall" (from Hadestown) – 3:35
"Now You Know" – 3:09
"If It's True" (from Hadestown) – 3:18
"Namesake" (from The Brightness)  – 2:41
"Young Man in America" (from Young Man in America) – 4:02
"Two Kids" (from Hymns for the Exiled) – 3:46
"The Pursewarden Affair" – 2:31
"His Kiss, the Riot" (from Hadestown) – 2:32
"Come September" (from Country (EP)) – 2:50
"You Are Forgiven" (from Young Man in America) – 3:23
"Our Lady of the Underground" (from Hadestown) – 3:18
"Cosmic American" (from Hymns for the Exiled) – 3:41

References

2014 albums
Anaïs Mitchell albums